Irish Magno (born July 27, 1991) is a Filipino amateur boxer who has represented the Philippines in international amateur competitions including the Asian Games and the World Championships. She has also qualified for the 2020 Summer Olympics, becoming the first female Filipino boxer to qualify for the Games. She did not win for her country but managed to get to the second round for her weight category.

Education
In 2020, Magno was pursuing a bachelor's degree in criminology at the University of Baguio.

Career
Magno's boxing career started when she was 16 years old. While watching amateur boxers train at the town plaza of her hometown of Janiuay, Iloilo, she was approached by a coach. The coach encouraged her to try out boxing due to her height. Prior to that time, Magno had an impression that boxing is exclusively for men. She competed at the National Open, Youth and Women's Amateur Boxing Championship which was hosted in Iloilo, learning that she would be competing in the national championship only three days prior. She was eliminated in the first round, with her opponent being Southeast Asian Games gold medalist Annie Albania.

She joined the Philippine national boxing team and moved to Manila upon learning that boxing could support her education due to her family's financial situation, with her mother being a housewife and her father a carpenter. Magno also had an older sister who was pursuing her collegiate studies. The opportunity to support her family financially is what kept Magno from quitting boxing.

Magno's first gold medal in an international competition was won at the 2012 Taipei Open in Taiwan. She has also regularly participated in the Southeast Asian Games, representing the Philippines in the 2013, 2015, and 2019 editions. Her silver medal in the women's flyweight division was in the 2019 games was her best finish in the Southeast Asian Games. She lost to Vietnam's Nguyễn Thị Tâm in that event's final.

In the 2018 Asian Games in Jakarta–Palembang, she competed in the bantamweight division.

She qualified for the 2020 Summer Olympics in March 2020 via the Asia/Oceania qualifiers held in Jordan. Magno became the first-ever female boxer representing the Philippines to qualify for the Olympics. However the Olympics itself was postponed to next year due to  the COVID-19 pandemic and had to train virtually with her national coaches from her hometown in Janiuay, Iloilo where she also decided to set up a boxing clinic.

Personal life
Magno has a girlfriend named Erny Ann Micua.

References

1991 births
Filipino women boxers
Boxers at the 2018 Asian Games
Southeast Asian Games silver medalists for the Philippines
Southeast Asian Games bronze medalists for the Philippines
Southeast Asian Games medalists in boxing
Sportspeople from Iloilo
Competitors at the 2013 Southeast Asian Games
Competitors at the 2015 Southeast Asian Games
Competitors at the 2019 Southeast Asian Games
University of Baguio alumni
Living people
Flyweight boxers
Bantamweight boxers
Asian Games competitors for the Philippines
Boxers at the 2020 Summer Olympics
Olympic boxers of the Philippines
Asian athletes
Filipino LGBT sportspeople
LGBT boxers
Competitors at the 2021 Southeast Asian Games